The Bowling Green Falcons women's basketball team is the NCAA Division I women's basketball team that represents Bowling Green State University. The team plays at the 4,700-seat Stroh Center on the BGSU campus in Bowling Green, Ohio, United States. The Falcons competes in the Mid-American Conference.

History
The Falcons have won the most MAC Championships, winning eleven tournament championships since its admission into the MAC in 1981. The team last played in the NCAA Division I women's basketball tournament in 2011.  The Falcons became the first team from the MAC to reach the NCAA Division I women's basketball tournament Sweet Sixteen, after they upset the second seed Vanderbilt 59–56 at the Breslin Student Events Center in East Lansing, Michigan in 2007.

Coaching history

-Bowling Green did not belong to a conference until the 1981–82 season.
-Records as of the end of the 2012–13 season.

Season-by-season results
''This is a partial list of the last five seasons completed by the Falcons.  
Records as of July 30, 2010.

| 2010-11 ||

AIAW/NCAA Tournament Results

The Falcons have appeared in ten NCAA Tournaments. Their combined record is 6–12.

AIAW

NCAA

See also
Bowling Green Falcons
Mid-American Conference

References

External links